The Immaculate Conception Cathedral is a religious building that serves as a Catholic cathedral located in the district of Antananarivo Renivohitra in the region of Analamanga, specifically in Antananarivo, the capital of Madagascar. It is located in the area of Andohalo in the upper town (haute ville), the facade facing the city center to the west. The cathedral is the seat of the Archdiocese of Antananarivo (Latin: Archidioecesis Antananarivensis).

History 
Its construction began in 1873 and was completed in 1890 with a design in Gothic style.

Architecture 

The cathedral is built in the gothic revival style.

See also
Roman Catholicism in Madagascar

References

Roman Catholic cathedrals in Madagascar
Buildings and structures in Antananarivo
Roman Catholic churches completed in 1890
19th-century Roman Catholic church buildings in Madagascar